Ahmed Naser Al-Raisi (also romanised as Ahmed Nasser Al-Raisi) is an Emirati military general officer. He currently serves as the 30th president of Interpol and the inspector general of the United Arab Emirates' interior ministry.

Early career and education 
According to his website, Al-Raisi joined the Abu Dhabi police force in 1980 as a member of the "burglar alarm branch". He rose through the ranks to become General Director of Central Operations in 2005. He received a BSc in computer science from Otterbein University in 1986, a diploma in police management from the University of Cambridge in 2004, an MBA from Coventry University in 2010 and a doctorate from London Metropolitan University in 2013.

He co-authored Social & security impact of the internet, which was published by the Emirates Center For Strategic Studies and Research in 2009.

Career 
Al-Raisi was appointed General Inspector of the interior ministry in 2015 and played a key role in the arrest of Matthew Hedges, a British academic accused of espionage by the UAE regime, in 2018. Human rights organisations say that Raisi oversees a "notoriously abusive" state security apparatus, which has misused the red notice system of Interpol.

He is a member of Interpol's executive committee and has served as the delegate of Asia since 2018.

Interpol presidential candidacy 

Al-Raisi was the official candidate of the United Arab Emirates to succeed Kim Jong Yang as President of Interpol in 2022. Accused of presiding over torture, his candidacy was strongly condemned by human rights groups. A coalition of 19 human rights groups, including Human Rights Watch and the Gulf Center for Human Rights, wrote an open letter to Interpol advising against his appointment. A report by David Calvert-Smith, a former chief prosecutor of the United Kingdom, said that Al-Raisi is unsuited to the post. Matthew Hedges asked members of Interpol not to consider Al-Raisi for the position.

In June 2021, a criminal complaint was filed in Paris by the Gulf Centre for Human Rights against Al-Raisi. The complaint accuses him of being responsible for the torture of Ahmed Mansoor, a prominent UAE dissident arrested in 2017.

Unusual for a normally opaque process, the UAE was promoting Al-Raisi by arranging his trips to the Interpol member countries to gain support, while he was viewed as an “international pariah”.

Al-Raisi was sued in multiple countries. Rodney Dixon, the lawyer of Matthew Hedges and Ali Ahmad, raised a complaint with the Swedish police to arrest al-Raisi upon his arrival to the country, as part of his campaign tour before the vote. Hedges and Ahmad raised a similar request with the Norwegian police authorities asking them for help and to use the opportunity of al-Raisi’s visit to arrest him, if an investigation is opened.

In November 2021, three members of the German parliament released a joint statement which said that electing Al-Raisi would endanger the reputation of Interpol and that the nomination violates the second article of Interpol's basic law. Thirty-five French legislators asked Emmanuel Macron to oppose Al-Raisi's candidacy in a letter. The United Arab Emirates rejected the German MP's concerns and said that they were proud of being "one of the safest countries in the world".

Election 
The election took place in Istanbul on 25 November with al-Raisi running against Šárka Havránková, a vice president of Interpol. Al-Raisi won after three rounds of voting and was elected for a four-year term with about 69% of votes. He is the first candidate from the Middle East to be elected president.

The United Arab Emirates are the second-largest contributor to Interpol's budget, which has led to allegations that the UAE bought the outcome of the election. Al-Raisi's part-time role will be mostly ceremonial, a fact Interpol emphasised repeatedly. However, al-Raisi seems keen to change Interpol's policies. His campaign promise to increase the use of modern technology at Interpol was seen by some as a reference to the electronic surveillance tools used by authoritarian regimes. Writing for the Neue Zürcher Zeitung,  called his election a reason for authoritarian countries to celebrate, as it would further erode the standing of human rights in international organisations. The Guardian's Ruth Michaelson characterised the election as a "big soft-power win" for the UAE.

Tenure as Interpol president 
In January 2022, al-Raisi first visited the headquarters of Interpol in Lyon.

A lawyer representing Emirati human rights activist Ahmed Mansoor, William Bourdon filed a torture complaint against Ahmed Nasser al-Raisi in a Paris court, under the principle of universal jurisdiction. Held in solitary confinement, Mansoor had been described as a prisoner of conscience by Amnesty International. The lawyers for Matthew Hedges and Ali Issa Ahmad, who had accused al-Raisi of torture, also filed a criminal complaint with investigative judges of the specialised judicial unit for crimes against humanity and war crimes of the Paris Tribunal.

On 25 January 2022, Serbian authorities extradited a Bahraini dissident, Ahmed Jaafar Mohamed Ali, in cooperation with Interpol, under the presidency of Ahmed Naser al-Raisi. The decision came despite an injunction to postpone the extradition until 25 February by the European Court of Human Rights (ECHR). Director of Advocacy at the Bahrain Institute for Rights and Democracy (BIRD), Sayed Ahmed Alwadaei said violating the decision of ECHR indicates how "red lines will be crossed" under al-Raisi's leadership. He said the Interpol will be "complicit in any abuse faced by Ali".

In March 2022, a preliminary inquiry was opened by the French anti-terror prosecutors into al-Raisi’s acts of barbarism and torture. He was under torture allegations, which William Bourdon said were adequate to lift his “diplomatic immunity”, adding that the French prosecutors should have ordered his immediate arrest.

In May 2022, Matthew Hedges and Ali Issa Ahmad testified before the investigative judges of the specialised judicial unit for crimes against humanity and war crimes in Paris Tribunal. The two former detainees told the judge that Ahmed Nasser al-Raisi was responsible for the torture, to which they were subjected while in detention in the UAE. Ahmad said “al-Raisi is to blame, as he was the chief of police and the prison service” and that he was aware of what was happening to him in the prison.

Outside activities 
Al-Raisi is the chairman of the American University in the Emirates' board of trustees. He also chairs the board of directors of the Baniyas Club.

References 

Emirati generals
Alumni of London Metropolitan University
Living people
Year of birth missing (living people)